Erika Eleniak (born September 29, 1969) is an American actress, Playboy Playmate, and model known for her role in Baywatch as Shauni McClain. Her film debut was in E.T.: The Extra-Terrestrial (1982). She starred in the films The Blob (1988), Under Siege (1992), and The Beverly Hillbillies (1993).

Early life
Erika Eleniak was born in Glendale, California. Her father, Dale Alan Eleniak, is of Ukrainian descent and her mother, Iris Maya (Neggo) Arnold is of Estonian and German descent. Eleniak's paternal great-grandfather, Wasyl Eleniak, was one of the first pioneer Ukrainian immigrants to settle in Canada.

Career
Eleniak's first feature-film role was at age 12, in the 1982 film E.T. the Extra-Terrestrial as the girl kissed by Elliott in the classroom scene. Her 10-year-old costar, Henry Thomas, told People magazine that he disliked filming the scene: “When I had to kiss the girl, I had to do it two times! I don’t like girls."

In 1988 she appeared as Vicki De Soto, a victim of the creature in the horror film The Blob, which was a remake of the 1958 film of the same name.

Eleniak appeared in the July 1989 issue of Playboy in a pictorial with a nautical theme. That same year, she began a recurring role in the TV series Charles in Charge as Charles's girlfriend Stephanie Curtis, and also won a role on Baywatch as female lead Shauni McClain, which she played from 1989 to 1992. She also played Carrie, the high-school girlfriend of Jesse (John Stamos), in "One Last Kiss", the November 16, 1990 episode of Full House.

In 1992, Eleniak returned to film acting, playing a Playboy Playmate hired to perform a striptease for the captain of a U.S. Navy battleship in Under Siege. In the film, she is described as "Miss July 1989"—the month that Eleniak was Playmate of the Month in real life.

She had a starring role as Elly May Clampett in the screen adaptation of The Beverly Hillbillies in 1993. The next year, she starred in the Dennis Hopper-directed romantic comedy film Chasers with William McNamara. Eleniak shot another movie with McNamara, Girl in the Cadillac (1995), and starred as identical twins in the interactive 1995 video game Panic in the Park. She continued to make more independent films until 2003.

Eleniak appeared on the reality television series The Real Gilligan's Island in June 2005.

Eleniak has suffered from weight issues. At one point, she was underweight due to an eating disorder and was once hospitalized for laxative abuse. By 2006, she was overweight and participated in the fourth season of VH1's Celebrity Fit Club.

In 2006, she appeared on 80's Movie and Music Fest Cafe, a British comedy podcast on iTunes, in which she discussed her career with presenters Ross Dyer and Julian Bayes. She gave a lighthearted view of Baywatch and her challenge during filming of Celebrity Fit Club.

Personal life
Eleniak was once engaged to her Baywatch co-star Billy Warlock, who had played her love interest on the show, as well. Eleniak married bodybuilder Philip Goglia on May 22, 1998, but after just six months, the marriage ended in divorce. After filming Snowbound in 2001 in Calgary, Alberta, Eleniak became enamored of the city. She began dating Roch Daigle, a key grip who worked on the set. She had wanted to leave Los Angeles as she found commuting to and from Telluride, Colorado, difficult. She purchased a home in Calgary, where Daigle lived. The two eventually married. Eleniak became pregnant in 2005, but six and a half weeks into her term, the pregnancy was discovered to be ectopic, which required emergency surgery, and ended in a miscarriage. Eleniak later became pregnant again and gave birth to a daughter.

Filmography

Film

Television

Radio

Video game

References

External links

 
 

1969 births
20th-century American actresses
21st-century American actresses
Actresses from Glendale, California
Actresses from Los Angeles
American child actresses
American expatriates in Canada
American film actresses
American people of Estonian descent
American people of German descent
American people of Ukrainian descent
American television actresses
Living people
Participants in American reality television series
People from Greater Los Angeles
1980s Playboy Playmates
Van Nuys High School alumni